La Sen Thai or La Sen Thai Puvanart was the king of Lan Xang from 1485 until 1495. He succeeded his older brother King Souvanna Banlang.

Laasaenthai was the sixth son of King Sai Tia Kaphut, Governor of Nongkai before his accession. Succeeded on the death of his childless elder brother, 1486. Crowned in 1491. He enjoyed peaceful relations with his neighbours in Vietnam led by Lê Thánh Tông and cultivated good relations with the Ayutthaya Kingdom, spending much of his time contemplating religious and legal matters, furthering the spread of Buddhism and building monuments. He was succeeded by his only son, Sompou.

Kings of Lan Xang
Year of birth unknown
1495 deaths
15th-century Laotian people
15th-century monarchs in Asia
Laotian Theravada Buddhists
1490s in Asia